is a 
Japanese music and video game company. They also had a subsidiary in America called Meldac of America before it became defunct in the 1990s.

Meldac has produced albums for Jennifer Love Hewitt (Love Songs), Christopher Sluka, and J-Walk. In addition to music albums, the company also published video games such as Zombie Nation for the Nintendo Entertainment System. They also made Heiankyo Alien and Mercenary Force for the Game Boy in addition to Uchuu Race: Astro Go! Go! for the Super Famicom. These games have been distributed by Tokuma Japan Communications through its TRI-M sublabel.

Video games
 U.S. Championship V'Ball (1989)
 Heiankyo Alien (1990)
 Mercenary Force (1990 – Game Boy Only)
 Zombie Nation (1990 – NES Only)
 Battle of Kingdom (1991)
 The King of Rally (1992)
 Yomihon Yumegoyomi: Tenjin Kaisen 2 (1992) – Japan only Game Boy sequel to Tenjin Kaisen (Mercenary Force)
 Super Pinball: Behind the Mask (1994)
 Uchuu Race: Astro Go! Go! (1994)

References

External links
 Meldac (Japanese)
 MobyGames

Mass media companies established in 1990
Video game companies of Japan
Japanese record labels
Video game publishers
Video game companies established in 1990
Japanese companies established in 1990